Nieuwland is a district in the Dutch city Amersfoort. The project started in 1995 and finished in 2001 when an area with 4500 houses was completed.

Amersfoort